Glen Rock or Glenrock may refer to:

Geology 

 Glen Rock (boulder) in Glen Rock, New Jersey

Places

Australia 

Glenrock, Queensland, a locality in the South Burnett Region, Queensland

United States
 Glenrock, Nebraska, an unincorporated community in Nemaha County
 Glen Rock, New Jersey, a borough in Bergen County
 Glen Rock, Pennsylvania, a borough in York County
 Glen Rock, Virginia, a neighborhood in Norfolk County
 Glenrock, Wyoming, a town in Converse County

Railway stations
 Glen Rock–Main Line station, on New Jersey Transit's Main Line
 Glen Rock–Boro Hall station, on New Jersey Transit's Bergen County Line